Machage is a Kenyan surname. Notable people with the surname include:

Sospeter Machage (born 1956), Kenyan diplomat
Wilfred Machage (1956–2022), Kenyan politician

See also
Machame

Surnames of Kenyan origin